The following is a list of the regions of Peru ordered by population from Census 2007 and estimated population of INEI.

Demographic Map

See also

 List of Peruvian regions by GDP
 List of cities in Peru
 List of metropolitan areas of Peru
 Regions of Peru

References

Regions